This is an attempt to list all islands of South Africa, regardless of whether they are located in oceans, rivers, lakes, or reservoirs.

This list is incomplete; you can help by expanding it.

List of Islands of South Africa

List of Islands in reservoires (or Dams) 
(and islands in Estuaries) Most of these Islands are Unnamed

See also 
 Estuaries in South Africa
 List of rivers of South Africa
 List of lakes in South Africa
 List of reservoirs and dams in South Africa
 Lagoons of South Africa
 List of Bays of South Africa

References 
  Department of Water Affairs
  data supplied as Google Earth files by the Resource Quality Services.

South Africa
Lists of landforms of South Africa